There are several rivers named Capivari River in Brazil:

 Capivari River (Bahia)
 Capivari River (Mato Grosso do Sul)
 Capivari River (Minas Gerais)
 Capivari River (Paraná)
 Capivari River (Paranapanema River)
 Capivari River (Pardo River tributary)
 Capivari River (Rio de Janeiro)
 Capivari River (Santa Catarina)
 Capivari River (Tietê River tributary)

See also 
 Capivara River (disambiguation)
 Capivari, a municipality in the state of São Paulo in Brazil